Phantogram is an American music duo from Greenwich, New York, formed in 2007 and consisting of multi-instrumentalists and vocalists Sarah Barthel and Josh Carter.

The band define their music as electronic rock, dream pop, electronica and trip hop, and have described their sound as "street beat, psych pop". According to Carter, their music has "lots of rhythms, swirling guitars, spacey keyboards, echoes, airy vocals". Carter and Barthel were inspired by numerous artists including the Beatles, David Bowie, Cocteau Twins, J Dilla, the Flaming Lips, John Frusciante, Serge Gainsbourg, Madlib, Sonic Youth, Yes, Kevin Shields, and Prince.

They write and record in a remote barn in Upstate New York called Harmonie Lodge. The band has released four studio albums (Eyelid Movies in 2010, Voices in 2014, Three in 2016 and Ceremony in 2020), four EPs (Phantogram and Running From the Cops in 2009, Nightlife in 2011, Phantogram in 2013) and 10 singles.

History

Carter and Barthel have been friends since preschool. In mid-2007, Barthel returned home dissatisfied with pursuing a visual arts degree at Champlain College in Vermont, and Carter returned home after a brief stint in New York City with Grand Habit, an experimental band formed with his older brother, John. The two friends reunited and worked on finishing some of Carter's earlier songwriting ideas, then finally formed the band. They played some live shows, but decided to focus the bulk of their energies on making records.

The duo was originally called Charlie Everywhere and used that name to perform around the Saratoga Springs, New York area and to release two EPs on local label Sub-Bombin Records. Upon signing with UK label Barely Breaking Even on January 26, 2009, they changed their name to Phantogram. Carter suggested the name Phantogram when the band wanted to switch from Charlie Everywhere to "something [they] liked". Upon looking up phantogram, they found that it referred to an optical illusion in which two-dimensional images appear to be three-dimensional, and noted parallels between this meaning and their band and music.

Phantogram's eponymous debut EP was self-released on the CE Records label on May 12, 2009, followed in the same year by another EP, Running From the Cops, issued on BBE. They signed with Barsuk Records in October 2009, after encouragement from Erich Cannon of Portland's Spectre Entertainment, who contacted them after he heard songs on their MySpace page. "We were going to write the record, finish it, and release it as a demo for upstate," explained Barthel. "Then our plan was to move down to New York [City] to do the whole networking and meeting people kind of stuff. And we kind of skipped that whole thing, just because of the internet."

Phantogram released their debut album, Eyelid Movies, on September 15, 2009 on BBE (Europe) and Indica Records (Canada), and on February 9, 2010 on Barsuk (US). The album received generally favorable reviews. The album included three singles: "Mouthful of Diamonds", "When I'm Small" and "As Far As I Can See".

The Nightlife EP was released on November 1, 2011. It included the single "Don't Move".

The duo collaborated with Big Boi from OutKast on three songs ("Objectum Sexuality", "CPU" and "Lines") from his second studio album, Vicious Lies and Dangerous Rumors, released in December 2012, and were credited as producers for the song "Objectum Sexuality". Phantogram were also featured on the Flaming Lips song "You Lust" from their 2013 album The Terror.

On September 30, 2013, Republic Records released the Phantogram EP, along with the single "Black Out Days". The band's second studio album, Voices, was released on February 18, 2014 by Barsuk/Republic. It included the singles "Bill Murray", 'Fall in Love" and "Nothing But Trouble".

In 2015, the band contributed the song "K.Y.S.A" to the Grand Theft Auto V soundtrack; the track appeared in "The Lab" radio station and was also included on the digital and physical versions of the Welcome to Los Santos album. The same year, Phantogram collaborated with Big Boi again, resulting in the seven-song EP Big Grams, released on September 25, 2015 by Epic Records. The EP featured production work from Big Boi, Phantogram, 9th Wonder and Skrillex. Barthel also guest appeared on the Miley Cyrus song "Slab of Butter (Scorpion)" from her album Miley Cyrus & Her Dead Petz.

The band's third album, Three, was released October 7, 2016 by Republic. It debuted at No. 5 on the Billboard''' Top Album Sales chart and No. 9 on the Billboard 200. It included the singles "You Don't Get Me High Anymore", "Run Run Blood", "Cruel World" and "Same Old Blues".

On May 18, 2018, the band released the single "Someday", backed by a cover of Sparklehorse's "Saturday"; all proceeds from the single were earmarked for donation to the American Foundation for Suicide Prevention.

In 2020, the band released their fourth studio album, Ceremony. Later that year, they released the single "Me & Me" accompanying the Netflix film A Babysitter's Guide to Monster Hunting.

The band featured on the Tom Morello song "Driving to Texas" from his 2021 album The Atlas Underground Fire.

In 2022, the band announced a reissue of Eyelid Movies and released the song "Suzie", an outtake from the recording sessions of Eyelid Movies, as an accompanying single.

Touring
Phantogram have played and toured with the Antlers, Beach House, Metric, Minus the Bear, Caribou, Zero 7, the xx, Ra Ra Riot, School of Seven Bells, Yeasayer, Brazilian Girls, Future Islands and the Glitch Mob. They opened for M83 at the Hollywood Bowl on September 22, 2013. In 2015, Phantogram opened for Alt-J at Madison Square Garden and toured the West Coast with Muse in December 2015 and again during the European leg of the Drones World Tour in April 2016.

Phantogram have played several major North American festivals including Austin City Limits, Osheaga, Coachella, Free Press Summer Fest, Sasquatch!, Bonnaroo, Hopscotch Music Festival, Treasure Island, Lollapalooza, Outside Lands, LouFest, Bumbershoot, Summerfest and Firefly.

In 2010, they enlisted drummer Tim Oakley, formerly of the Mathematicians (where he played under the name Albert Gorithm IV), for their tour. In 2013, the band added guitarist/synth player Nicholas Shelestak to the touring band, while Chris Carhart took over on drums.

Phantogram were announced to perform at the summer 2017 WayHome Music & Arts Festival in Oro-Medonte, Ontario.

Members
 Sarah Barthel – vocals, keyboards, piano, programming, synthesizers, guitars, production (2007–present)
 Josh Carter – vocals, guitars, programming, synthesizers, drums, percussion, production (2007–present)

Discography
 Studio albums 

 EPs 

Singles

 As featured artist 

Music videos

Guest appearances

As Big Grams
 Big Grams'' with Big Boi; (2015, Epic)

Notes

References

External links 

2007 establishments in New York (state)
American electronic music duos
Barsuk Records artists
Electronic music groups from New York (state)
Fiction Records artists
Indie rock musical groups from New York (state)
Musical groups established in 2007
Musical groups from New York City
Republic Records artists
Trip hop groups
Barely Breaking Even artists
Ghostly International artists
Male–female musical duos